Philip Crampton may refer to:

 Sir Philip Crampton, 1st Baronet (1777–1858), Irish surgeon and anatomist
 Philip Cecil Crampton (1783–1862), judge, politician and Solicitor-General for Ireland
 Phil Crampton, mountaineer

See also
Crampton (surname)